Johann Ludwig Alexius von Loudon, born 10 January 1767 – died 22 September 1822, was the nephew of Feldmarschall Ernst Gideon von Laudon.

Military career 
He first enlisted in the Imperial Russian Army and rose to the rank of captain. He served until 1789 when joined his famous uncle in the army of Habsburg Austria. He married an Austrian noblewoman in 1791. The next year he was appointed colonel in command of an infantry regiment and fought at the First Battle of Wissembourg in 1793. Promoted to general officer in 1796, he was posted to Italy where he commanded a brigade under Paul Davidovich at Calliano. In early 1797 he led an independent column composed largely of Tyrolean militia and received a coveted award for his efforts.

In 1799 Loudon led a grenadier brigade at Novi and in a few other actions. Promoted again, he was transferred to Poland in 1800 and missed Marengo. In the War of the Third Coalition he fought at Elchingen and was captured by the French at Ulm. He commanded second-line troops in the 1809 campaign and retired from military life soon after.

Death 
He died at Hadersdorf in 1822.

References

Austrian soldiers
Austrian generals
Austrian Empire military leaders of the French Revolutionary Wars
Austrian Empire commanders of the Napoleonic Wars
Military leaders of the French Revolutionary Wars
Military personnel from Riga
1767 births
1822 deaths